Samuel Harding (born 1 December 1980) is a rugby union footballer who plays at flanker. He was born in Subiaco.

In 2002, Harding won a cap with the New Zealand national rugby union team against Fiji.

Between 2002 and 2004, Harding played for the Highlanders and spent the following season with the Crusaders where he won his first Super 12 competition. In September 2005, he moved to Northampton Saints and then onto Ulster. He commenced his retirement from the game in 2007 with a one-year stint in Italy at Rugby Viadana and then played his final season in Seville, Spain.

Sam Harding has a younger sister, Polly Harding from KIIS 1011 breakfast radio show http://www.jaseandpj.com.au

References

1980 births
New Zealand international rugby union players
Living people
New Zealand rugby union players
Rugby union flankers
Rugby union players from Perth, Western Australia